This is an inclusive list of science fiction television programs whose names begin with the letter U.

U
Live-action
UFO (1970–1971, UK)
Ultra Series (franchise):
Ultra Q (1966, Japan)
Ultraman (1966–1967, Japan)
Ultra Seven (1967–1968, Japan)
Ultra Fight (1970–1971, Japan)
Return of Ultraman, The (1971–1972, Japan)
Ultraman Ace (1972–1973, Japan)
Ultraman Taro (1973–1974, Japan)
Ultraman Leo (1974–1975, Japan)
Ultraman 80 (1980–1981, Japan)
Ultraman: Towards the Future (1992, Australia/Japan)
Ultraman vs. Kamen Rider (1993, Japan, special)
Heisei Ultra Seven (1994, Japan)
Ultraman: The Ultimate Hero (1995, US/Japan)
Ultraman Tiga (1996–1997, Japan)
Ultraman Dyna (1997–1998, Japan)
Ultraman Gaia (1998–1999, Japan)
Ultraman Nice (1999–2000, Japan)
Ultraman Cosmos (2001–2002, Japan)
Ultra Q: Dark Fantasy (2004, Japan)
Ultraman Nexus (2004–2005, Japan)
Ultraman Max (2005–2006, Japan)
Ultraman Mebius (2006–2007, Japan)
Ultraseven X (2007, Japan)
Ultra Galaxy Mega Monster Battle (2007–2008, Japan)
Ultra Galaxy Mega Monster Battle: Never Ending Odyssey (2008–2009, Japan)
Neo Ultra Q (2013, Japan)
Ultraman Ginga (2013, Japan)
Ultraman Ginga S (2014, Japan)
Ultraman X (2015, Japan)
Ultraman Orb (2016, Japan)
Ultraviolet (1998, UK) (elements of science fiction)
Undermind (1965)
Under the Dome (2013–2015)
Under the Mountain (1981–1982, New Zealand, miniseries)
Unforeseen, The (1960, UK, anthology) IMDb
Uninvited, The (1997, UK)
Unnatural History (2010, US/Canada, anthology) (elements of science fiction in some episodes)
Urban Gothic (2000) (elements of science fiction in some episodes)
UpGrade: The Web Series
Utopia Falls (2020)

Animated
UFO Warrior Dai Apolon (1976–1977, Japan, animated)
Ultraman, The (1979–1980, Japan, animated)
Ultraforce (1995, animated)
Ulysses 31 aka Space Legend Ulysses 31 (Japan) (1981–1982, France/Japan, animated)
Underdog (1964–1973, animated)
URBO: The Adventures of Pax Afrika (2006, South Africa, animated)

References

Television programs, U